Rowe Lake is a lake in Berrien County, in the U.S. state of Michigan.

Rowe Lake has the name of John Rowe, a pioneer settler.

References

Lakes of Berrien County, Michigan